Statistics of Chinese Taipei National Football League in the 1987 season.

Overview
Taipower won the championship.

References
RSSSF

1983
1
Taipei
Taipei